is a subway station in Minato, Tokyo operated by Tokyo Metro. The Station Number is H-05.

Station layout

Bus services
 bus stop
Toei Bus
<渋88> Shibuya Sta. mae - Roppongi Sta. mae - Kamiyacho Sta. mae - Tokyo Tower Entrance - Toranomon - Shimbashi Sta. mae
<橋86> Meguro Sta. mae - Azabu-jūban Sta. mae - Akabanebashi Sta. Mae - Kamiyacho Sta. mae - Tokyo Tower Entrance - Shimbashi Sta. mae
<浜95甲> Shinagawa Garage mae -> Shinagawa Sta. East Exit -> Hamamatsuchō Sta. mae -> Daimon Sta. mae -> Kanayachō Sta. mae -> Tokyo Tower Entrance -> Tokyo Tower

Surrounding area
 Tokyo Tower
 Atago Green Hills

History
March 25, 1964: opened.
January 27, 1968: A fire broke out on board a Tobu 2000 series train.
March 20, 1995: The sarin gas attack on the Tokyo subway occurred. The station was frequently mentioned in news reports in the aftermath.
April 1, 2004: Tis station's operator became Tokyo Metro.

References

External links

 Tokyo Metro station information 
 Tokyo Metro station information 

Railway stations in Tokyo
Railway stations in Japan opened in 1964
Tokyo Metro Hibiya Line
Stations of Tokyo Metro